The  men's 100 metre backstroke was one of six swimming events on the swimming at the 1908 Summer Olympics programme. It was the only backstroke event on the schedule. It was the first appearance of the event, after a 100-yard event was held in 1904. The competition was held on Thursday July 16, 1908 and on Friday July 17, 1908.

Each nation could enter up to 12 swimmers. Twenty-one swimmers from eleven nations competed.

Records

These were the standing world and Olympic records (in minutes) prior to the 1908 Summer Olympics.

(*) 100 yards (= 91.44 m)

In the first heat Arno Bieberstein set the first Olympic record with 1:25.6 minutes. In the first semi-final he equalized his time and in the final he bettered his own record with 1:24.6 minutes. The time set in the final was the first official world record for this distance.

Competition format

With a much larger field than in 1904, the 1908 competition expanded to three rounds: heats, semifinals, and a final. The 1908 Games also restored the wild-card system from 1900, allowing the fastest swimmers who did not win their heat to advance. The nine heats consisted of between 1 and 6 swimmers, with the winner of the heat advancing along with the fastest loser from across the heats (all tied swimmers advanced in the case of equal times). There were two semifinals, intended to be of 5 swimmers each but one of which actually had 6 due to a tie in the heats; the top 2 finishers in each semifinal (regardless of overall time) advanced to the 4-person final.

Each race involved a single length of the 100 metre pool, with no turns. There was little regulation of the stroke, other than that the swimmer had to remain on his back and turns had to be made with both hands touching the wall.

Results

First round

Thursday July 16, 1908: The fastest swimmer in each heat and the fastest loser advanced, qualifying 8 swimmers for the semifinals.

Heat 1

Heat 2

Heat 3

Heat 4

Heat 5

Parvin had no competition in the fifth heat.

Heat 6

Heat 7

Kugler started before the signal, causing him to be disqualified and his first-place finish nullified.

Semifinals

Thursday July 16, 1908: The fastest two swimmers from each semifinal advanced to the final.

Semifinal 1

Semifinal 2

Final

Friday July 17, 1908.

References

Sources
 
 

Men's backstroke 0100 metres